The Rote Wand ("Red Wall") is a mountain in the Lechquellen Mountains range of Vorarlberg, in western Austria.

The name "Red Wall (Rote Wand)" originates from the distinct red-Lias limestone, which is particularly striking in the south wall. On the north side is a small glacier, the source of the Meng River.

The mountain is a popular hiking destination, but designated only for experienced, sure-footed mountain walkers. The route can be accessed from the Alpe Laguz, Alpe Klesenza, the Freiburger hut and the Formarinsee. All routes lead via a very steep climb up the north-west flank, via the north ridge to the summit.

However, the peak had been reached before by unknown climbers as Douglass and Sternbach found a signal pole on the summit. After 1867 the mountain was a popular destination for mountaineers. In 1874 John Sholto Douglass, a native of Vorarlberg of Scottish descent, fell to his death near the Rote Wand while hunting chamois.

In much literature the first ascent is ascribed to David Pappus and companions on 25 July 1610 during his exploration of the borders of the Sonnenberg and Bludenz Counties. Pappus however did not mention this in his detailed account. The "Rote Wand" that he did describe climbing is the 2,105 m high Garsellakopf on the border with Liechtenstein.

References

Mountains of the Alps
Lechquellen Mountains
Mountains of Vorarlberg